Paulo Diebold was a Brazilian rower. He competed in the men's coxless pair event at the 1948 Summer Olympics.

References

Year of birth missing
Year of death missing
Brazilian male rowers
Olympic rowers of Brazil
Rowers at the 1948 Summer Olympics
Place of birth missing